Right On is a Canadian youth television series which aired on CBC Television from 1972 to 1973.

Premise
This live broadcast featured performances by Canadian guest artists such as Martin Short. Gary Gross led the series house band which included percussionist Paul Zaza.

Scheduling
This half-hour series was broadcast on Wednesdays at 5:00 p.m. (Eastern time) from 13 December 1972 to 28 March 1973.

References

External links
 
 

CBC Television original programming
1972 Canadian television series debuts
1973 Canadian television series endings